Glassworks is a chamber music work of six movements by Philip Glass. Following his larger-scale concert and stage works, it was Glass's successful attempt to create a more pop-oriented "Walkman-suitable" work, with considerably shorter and more accessible pieces written for the recording studio.

The LP and cassette were released in 1982, each with its own separate mix: the record album intended for home listening and the tape for personal cassette players. The headphone-specific mix, previously only available on cassette, was reissued digitally 2016.

Movements

"Opening"
Formally it consists of three groups of four measure phrases of three to four chords repeated four times each, ABC:||ABC, which then merges with the next movement, "Floe" with the entrance of the horns. The movement has been arranged for and performed by Gamelan Pacifica.

"Floe"
There are two formulaically identical sections to the movement. Although rhythmically driven, the melodic implications of "Floe" occur somewhat coincidentally by orchestration. There is no modulation, but the harmonic progression simply repeats over and over again. The layering of contrasting timbres is characteristic of the piece as a whole. Floe borrows a theme from Jean Sibelius's fifth symphony.

"Rubric" and "Façades" both appeared in the 2008 documentary about Philippe Petit, Man on Wire. "Floe" was featured on the soundtrack of the 1989 Italian horror film The Church.

Release and reception

Glassworks has a 4.5/5 rating on Allmusic.  The album was commercially successful, introduced Glass' music to a large audience, and gave Glass widespread name recognition.

References

1981 compositions
1982 albums
Compositions by Philip Glass
Philip Glass albums